The Long–Allen Bridge is a truss bridge in Bossier City, Louisiana, named for Louisiana governors Huey Long and Oscar K. Allen. Opened in 1933, it carries US 79/US 80 across the Red River. It is also known as the Texas Street Bridge.

See also
List of bridges documented by the Historic American Engineering Record in Louisiana

References

External links

Bridges of the United States Numbered Highway System
Buildings and structures in Shreveport, Louisiana
Buildings and structures in Bossier City, Louisiana
Historic American Engineering Record in Louisiana
Red River of the South
U.S. Route 79
U.S. Route 80